James Dellet (February 18, 1788December 21, 1848) was an American politician and a member of the United States House of Representatives from Alabama.

Biography

Early life
He was born on February 18, 1788, in Camden, New Jersey. He moved to Columbia, South Carolina, with his parents in 1800. In 1810, he graduated from the University of South Carolina in Columbia. He studied law, was admitted to the bar in 1813, and practiced. He moved to the Alabama Territory in 1818, settling in Claiborne, and continued the practice of law. He worked with William B. Travis of Alamo fame.

Political career
In 1819, he was elected to the first Alabama House of Representatives under state government. He served as its secretary, and he was re-elected in both 1821 and 1825.

In the 1830s, he partnered with Lyman Gibbons, who married Dellet's daughter Emma, and who went on to serve on the Alabama Supreme Court.

He was an unsuccessful Whig candidate for Congress in 1833, but he was later elected as a Whig to the Twenty-sixth Congress. He served from March 4, 1839, to March 3, 1841, and from March 4, 1843, to March 3, 1845, after he was again elected to the Twenty-eighth Congress. He resumed the practice of law and engaged in agricultural pursuits.

Death
He died on December 21, 1848, in Claiborne, Alabama, in Monroe County. He was interred in a private cemetery on his Dellet Park plantation at Claiborne.

References

External links

Members of the Alabama House of Representatives
1788 births
1848 deaths
Whig Party members of the United States House of Representatives from Alabama
19th-century American politicians
American lawyers admitted to the practice of law by reading law
People from Camden, New Jersey
People from Columbia, South Carolina
People from Monroe County, Alabama
Alabama lawyers
University of South Carolina alumni
19th-century American lawyers